John Archdall was an Irish Anglican priest.

Archdall was born in County Fermanagh and educated at Trinity College, Dublin. He was Archdeacon of Killala from 1636 to 1637;  and then of Achonry from 1637 to 1638.

References 

Archdeacons of Achonry
17th-century Irish Anglican priests
Archdeacons of Killala
People from County Fermanagh